Inge Moyel Beeken (27 May 1921 – 10 July 1987) was a Danish diver. She competed in the women's 10 metre platform event at the 1948 Summer Olympics.

References

External links
 
 

1921 births
1987 deaths
Danish female divers
Olympic divers of Denmark
Divers at the 1948 Summer Olympics
Divers from Copenhagen